Mohd Arif Fazlie bin Saidin (born 30 January 1987) is a Malaysian footballer. His playing position is as a central defender.

Career
Arif Fazlie started his professional career in Perak FA youth squad. Starting from the 2009 season, he was one of several Perak youth players promoted to main squad after the exodus of Perak players to other teams. He played 2 games during Perak's 2009 Malaysia Super League campaign.

He signed to play for Penang in 2011. He dropped down a division to join Penang, who were just relegated to the 2011 Malaysia Premier League. His contract was not renewed at the end of the 2011 season.

After a year without a club, he joined Perak YBU FC for the 2013 Malaysia FAM League season. After the club were disbanded following the conclusion of the 2014 Malaysia FAM League season, Arif is currently a free agent.

International career
He have played in the Malaysia national under-21 football team in 2005.

References

External links
 Mohd Arif Fazlie profile at Seladang.net
 

1987 births
Living people
Malaysian footballers
Perak F.C. players
People from Perak
Malaysian people of Malay descent
Association football defenders